The Island Bay Yacht Club is a private yacht club located in Springfield, Illinois, on the shore of Lake Springfield.

Fleets 
The club is home of the following One-Design racing fleets:
JY15
C-Scow
Sunfish
Optimist
J/22
Laser
Thistle

Sailors 
IBYC member Dave Chapin was 3 times world champion, after winning the Snipe Worlds in 1979 with Timothy Dixon, and the Sunfish Worlds in 1979 and 1981, besides several times national and North American champion in Laser, Sunfish, Snipe, 470 and Soling.

References

External links 
 Official website

1935 establishments in Illinois
Sailing in Illinois
Sports in Springfield, Illinois
Yacht clubs in the United States